Hablas may refer to:
 Hablas, Piranshahr
 Hablas, Lajan, Piranshahr County